Katrin Velkova (born 16 August 1991) is a Bulgarian group rhythmic gymnast.

Career 
She represents her nation at international competitions. She participated at the 2012 Summer Olympics in London. She also competed at world championships, including at the 2010 and 2011 World Rhythmic Gymnastics Championships.

References

External links
http://www.bbc.com/sport/olympics/2012/athletes/f0b8055d-dde8-4a11-9a1a-6c0f78da6c51
http://www.intlgymnast.com/index.php?option=com_content&view=article&id=3349:fig-releases-official-olympic-roster&catid=92:2012-olympic-news&Itemid=242
http://www.gettyimages.com/photos/london-2012-gymnastics?page=6&excludenudity=true&sort=mostpopular&mediatype=photography&phrase=london%202012%20gymnastics

1991 births
Living people
Bulgarian rhythmic gymnasts
Place of birth missing (living people)
Gymnasts at the 2012 Summer Olympics
Olympic gymnasts of Bulgaria
Medalists at the Rhythmic Gymnastics World Championships
Medalists at the Rhythmic Gymnastics European Championships